Bouzyges is a culture hero from Greek mythology, credited with the invention of many agricultural practices; most notably, he was the first man to yoke oxen to a plough and introduced cultivation to Athens. He has been associated with Epimenides.

The name was also used by an order of priests associated with the Eleusinian Mysteries; these priests, collectively known as the Bouzygai, were also the priests of Zeus at the Palladium. They also served as priests elsewhere such as Ilissus. The Bouzygai could also refer to the clan that claimed descent from Bouzyges. An annual festival was celebrated in his honor at the foot of the Acropolis and this was presided by a member of such family.  It is said that Pericles may have been one of the Bouzygai. However, some scholars disputed this, suggesting that this clan is an inferior counterpart of the Athenian statesman. 
.

References

Characters in Greek mythology